Araban is a town in Gaziantep Province of Turkey. The population is 9,863 as of 2010.

History
The city was historically known as Raban. In October/November 958, the Byzantine Empire led by John Tzimiskes and Basil Lekapenos managed to defeat Sayf al-Dawla of the Hamdanids at the Battle of Raban.

Raban was ruled by the Armenian ruler Kogh Vasil, following the First Crusade in 1097. It was captured by Kilij Arslan II in 1148–1150, then by Nur ad-Din in 1155. In 1268, King Hethum I had to surrendered several fortresses including Raban to Baibars, who had imprisoned Hethum's son, Leo, following the Battle of Mari.

See also
Roman mausoleums of Araban

References

Sources
 

Populated places in Gaziantep Province
Araban District